The year 1935 in science and technology involved some significant events, listed below.

Astronomy
 May 14 – Opening of the Griffith Observatory in Los Angeles, California.
 October 3 – Opening of the Hayden Planetarium in New York City.

Chemistry
 February 28–March 1 – Working with polyamides to develop a viable new fiber for chemical company DuPont, American chemist Gérard Berchet working under the direction of Wallace Carothers first synthesizes the synthetic polymer nylon at Wilmington, Delaware.
 April 13 – Dorothy Hodgkin publishes her first solo paper, on the methodology of X-ray crystallography of insulin.
 Vitamin E is first isolated in a pure form by Gladys Anderson Emerson at the University of California, Berkeley.
 Eastman Kodak first market Kodachrome subtractive color reversal film as 16 mm movie film. It has been invented by two professional musicians, Leopold Godowsky Jr. and Leopold Mannes.

Ecology
 English botanist Arthur Tansley introduces the concept of the ecosystem.

Geology
 Charles Richter and Beno Gutenberg develop the Richter magnitude scale for quantifying earthquakes.

History of science and technology
 American bacteriologist Hans Zinsser publishes Rats, lice and history: being a study in biography, which... deals with the life history of typhus fever.
 Cornish Engines Preservation Committee formed to conserve the Levant Mine beam engine in Cornwall, England.

Mathematics
 April 19 – Alonzo Church presents his paper "An unsolvable problem of elementary number theory", introducing his theorem on the Entscheidungsproblem, to the American Mathematical Society.
 Octav Onicescu and Gheorghe Mihoc develop the notion of the "chain with complete links" in probability theory.
 George Pólya develops counting techniques for graphs as algebra.
 George K. Zipf proposes Zipf's law on probability distribution.

Pharmacology
 January 2 – IG Farben are granted a patent in Germany for the medical application of the first sulfonamide prodrug, Sulfonamidochrysoidine (KI-730; marketed as Prontosil). In February, Gerhard Domagk and others publish (in Deutsche Medizinische Wochenschrift) the first clinical results on its properties as an antibiotic, the first commercially available; and in November a team directed by Ernest Fourneau at the Pasteur Institute identify sulfanilamide as the active component.

Physics
 January 8 – A.C. Hardy patents the spectrophotometer.
 February 26 – Robert Watson-Watt and Arnold Wilkins first demonstrate the reflection of radio waves from an aircraft, near Daventry in England; on June 17, the first radio detection of an aircraft by ground-based radar is made at Orford Ness.
 Einstein, Podolsky, and Rosen publish a paper arguing that quantum mechanics is not a complete physical theory (the EPR paradox). Discussion of this introduces the 'Schrödinger's cat' thought experiment.
 Jacques Yvon introduces S-particle distribution functions in classical statistical mechanics; they will later be included in the BBGKY hierarchy.

Physiology and medicine
 January 28 – Iceland becomes the first country to legalize abortion on medical grounds.
 May – The hormone testosterone is first isolated and named by a team at Organon in the Netherlands led by German scientist Ernst Laqueur. In August, the chemical synthesis of testosterone from cholesterol is achieved by Adolf Butenandt and Günther Hanisch. A week later, the Ciba group in Zurich, Leopold Ruzicka and A. Wettstein, publish their synthesis of the hormone.
 Ladislas J. Meduna discovers metrazol shock therapy.
 First vaccine for yellow fever.
 German physician Karl Matthes develops the first two-wavelength ear O2 saturation meter.

Technology
 January 24 – The first beer can is sold in Richmond, Virginia, United States, by the Gottfried Krueger Brewing Company.
 June 12 – Conrad Bahr and George Pfefferle file a United States patent for an adjustable ratcheting torque wrench.
 July 16 – The world's first parking meter is installed in Oklahoma City to a design by Holger George Thuesen and Gerald A. Hale patented by Carl Magee.
 November 6
 Edwin H. Armstrong presents his paper on FM broadcasting, "A Method of Reducing Disturbances in Radio Signaling by a System of Frequency Modulation", to the New York section of the Institute of Radio Engineers.
 First flight of the Hawker Hurricane British fighter aircraft, designed by Sydney Camm.
 Callender-Hamilton bridge patented by A. M. Hamilton.

Events
 September 16–21 – First Congress for the Unity of Science is held at the Sorbonne.

Awards
 Nobel Prizes
 Physics – James Chadwick
 Chemistry – Frédéric Joliot, Irène Joliot-Curie
 Medicine – Hans Spemann

Births
 January 26 – Andrew J. Stofan, American astronautical engineer.
 January 29 – Roger Payne, American biologist and zoologist.
 February 15 – Roger B. Chaffee (died in accident 1967), American astronaut.
 February 27 – Anne Treisman, née Taylor, English-born psychologist.
 April 11 – Kazys Almenas (died 2017), Lithuanian physicist, engineer and publisher.
 April 25 – Jim Peebles, Canadian-born theoretical cosmologist, winner of the Nobel Prize in Physics.
 June 14 – Louise Hay, née Schmir (died 1989), French-born American mathematician.
 June 25 – Charles Sheffield (died 2002), English-born science fiction author and physicist.
 June 30 – Animesh Chakravorty, Bengali Indian academic, chemistry professor.
 July 2 – Sergei Khrushchev, Soviet, Russian and American scientist (died 2020)
 July 7 – H. Franklin Bunn, American physician, hematologist and biochemist
 July 12 – Satoshi Ōmura, Japanese biochemist, winner of the Nobel Prize in Physiology or Medicine.
 July 14 – Ei-ichi Negishi, Japanese chemist, winner of the Nobel Prize in Chemistry.
 August 3 – Georgy Shonin (died 1997), Ukrainian cosmonaut.
 August 26 – Karen Spärck Jones (died 2007), English computer scientist.
 September 11 – Gherman Titov (died 2000), Soviet cosmonaut.
 September 12 – Harvey J. Alter, American virologist, winner of the Nobel Prize.
 September 19 – Milan Antal  (died 1999), Slovak astronomer
 October 23 – JacSue Kehoe, American neuroscientist 
 October 26 – Ora Mendelsohn Rosen (died 1990), American biomedical researcher.
 October 31 – Ronald Graham (died 2020), American mathematician.
 November 11 – Magdi Yacoub, Egyptian-born cardiothoracic surgeon.
 November 20 – Michael F. Ashby, English materials engineer.
 December 27 – Stephan Tanneberger (died 2018), German oncologist, chemist.

Deaths
 February 15 – Bohuslav Brauner, Czech chemist (born 1855)
 March 7 – Mary Gage Day, American physician (born 1857)
 March 12 – Mihajlo Pupin (born 1858), Serbian American physicist.
 March 16 – John James Rickard Macleod (born 1876), Scottish physician and physiologist, winner of the Nobel Prize in Physiology or Medicine.
 May 12 – Abraham Groves (born 1847), Canadian surgeon.
 May 21 – Hugo de Vries, Dutch botanist and geneticist (born 1848)
 July 3 – André Citroën (born 1878), French automobile manufacturer.
 August 21 – Kintarô Okamura (born 1867), Japanese phycologist.
 September 19 – Konstantin Tsiolkovsky, Russian rocket scientist (born 1857)
 September 28 – W. K. Dickson (born 1860), British cinematographic pioneer.
 December 4 – Charles Richet (born 1850), French physiologist, winner of the Nobel Prize in Physiology or Medicine.
 November 6 – Henry Fairfield Osborn (born 1857), American paleontologist.
 November 21 – Agnes Pockels (born 1862), German chemist.
 December 10 – Sir John Carden, 6th Baronet (born 1892), English tank and vehicle designer (died in 1935 SABENA Savoia-Marchetti S.73 crash).
 December 12 – Charles Loomis Dana (born 1852), American neurologist.
 December 13 – Victor Grignard, French chemist, Nobel Prize laureate (born 1871)

References

 
20th century in science
1930s in science